Hollandia Roeiclub (HRC) is a Dutch rowing club based in Utrecht.

History

The club appears in the 2010 movie The Social Network (which was based on real events) beating the Harvard team of the Winklevoss twins in the finals of The Grand Challenge Cup during the Henley Royal Regatta in 2004, which they won representing the Holland Acht (Holland 8), the official Dutch rowing team. As a result of their win (the first Dutch men's eight victory at Henley, which they repeated in 2006) they qualified for the 2004 Summer Olympics in which they won the silver medal.

In 2019 the Hollandia Acht (Netherlands U23) rowed a Ladies' Challenge Plate record in Henley during the semi finals against Leander Club.

Honours

Henley Royal Regatta

References

External links
 Official website
Henley Royal Regatta 2004 Grand Finals on YouTube
Scene from The Social Network on YouTube
Hollandia Ladies' Challenge Plate Henley Royal Regatta 2019 record

Rowing clubs in the Netherlands